Lewis Lee Millett Sr. (December 15, 1920 – November 14, 2009) was a United States Army officer who received the Medal of Honor during the Korean War for leading the last major American bayonet charge.

He enlisted in the U.S. National Guard while still in high school and then in 1940 joined the U.S. Army Air Corps. When he thought that the United States would not participate in World War II he deserted and went to Canada with a friend where they joined the Canadian Army and were sent to London. He served briefly with the Canadian Forces in London but soon transferred to the U.S. Army, which had since joined the war. While serving with the Army in World War II, he received a Silver Star for driving a burning ammunition truck away from a group of soldiers before it exploded.

During the Korean War, he was awarded the United States military's highest decoration, the Medal of Honor. The citation explains that he successfully led a bayonet charge against the enemy. He later served in the Vietnam War as well. He retired from the Army in 1973 and died of congestive heart failure in 2009.

Early life
Millett was born on December 15, 1920, in Mechanic Falls, Maine. He grew up in South Dartmouth, Massachusetts, having moved there with his mother after his parents divorced and his mother remarried. His grandfather had served in the American Civil War and an uncle fought in World War I with the 101st Field Artillery Regiment of the Massachusetts Army National Guard.

World War II
While still attending high school in Dartmouth, he enlisted in the Massachusetts National Guard in 1938 and joined his uncle's old regiment, the 101st Field Artillery. In 1940, he joined the United States Army Air Corps and entered gunnery school. When it appeared that the U.S. would not enter World War II, Millett, eager to fight, deserted in mid-1941. With a friend who had received a bad conduct discharge from the U.S. Marine Corps, Millett hitchhiked to Canada and enlisted in the Canadian Army. Assigned to the Royal Regiment of Canadian Artillery, he was sent to the United Kingdom, where he served as an anti-aircraft radar operator in London during the Blitz. Once the U.S. had entered the war; Millett transferred to the U.S. Army in 1942.

Assigned to the 27th Armored Field Artillery Regiment, 1st Armored Division, Millett served in Tunisia as an anti-tank gunner during Operation Torch. During an engagement there, he drove a burning ammunition-filled half-track away from Allied soldiers, jumping to safety just before it exploded. For this action, he was awarded the U.S. military's third-highest decoration, the Silver Star. He later shot down a Messerschmitt Bf 109 fighter plane using half-track mounted machine guns.

Millett, by then a sergeant, next took part in the Allied invasion of Italy and fought in the Battle of Salerno and the subsequent Battle of Anzio. It was at this time that the U.S. Army discovered Millet's 1941 desertion; he was court-martialed, convicted, ordered to pay a 52 fine (roughly $825 in 2022) and stripped of his leave privileges. Only weeks later, he was given a battlefield commission to second lieutenant.

Korean War
After World War II, Millett attended Bates College in Lewiston, Maine, for three years before being called up to serve in the Korean War.

On 5 December 1950 Capt Millett was flying as an observer in a Stinson L-5 Sentinel when Capt J.F.O. Davis DFC, 2 Sqn SAAF attached to 18 Fighter Bomber Wing, crash landed his F-51D Mustang in North Korea.
The pilot of the L-5 landed on a road near the downed Mustang and Millett gave up his seat to Capt Davis. This was an outstanding act of bravery as the area was surrounded by enemy troops.
When the pilot of the L-5 returned to the scene, no trace of Millett could be found. Just before dark the L-5 returned, found and picked Millet up. 

By February 7, 1951, Millett was serving in South Korea as a captain and commander of Company E of the 2nd Battalion, 27th Infantry Regiment. On that day, near Soam-Ni, he led his company in an assault on an enemy position atop Hill 180 near Anyang. When one platoon became pinned down by heavy fire, Millett took another platoon forward, joined the two groups, and led them up the hill. Wielding his bayonet and throwing hand grenades, Millett yelled encouragement to his soldiers throughout the hand to hand fight. Upon reaching the top of the hill, his men stormed the enemy position and forced the opposing soldiers to withdraw. Although wounded in the shin by grenade fragments, Millett refused to be evacuated until the position was secured. Historian S.L.A. Marshall described the attack as "the most complete bayonet charge by American troops since ". Out of about 50 enemy dead, roughly 20 were found to have been killed by bayonets, and the location subsequently became known as Bayonet Hill.

For his leadership during the assault, Millett was awarded the Medal of Honor. The medal was formally presented to him by President Harry S Truman in July 1951.

Vietnam War
After the Korean War, Millett attended Ranger School at Fort Benning, Georgia. He served in the 101st Airborne Division as an intelligence officer and later served in the Vietnam War as a military advisor to the controversial Phoenix Program, which aimed to root out and kill Viet Cong sympathizers. While at the 101st Airborne in 1959 he was the commander of the first  "Recondo" (reconnaissance–commando) school which trained NCOs in small unit tactics and patrolling skills. In the mid-1960s, he commanded the Army Security Agency training center at Fort Devens, Massachusetts. In 1963, he earned a Bachelor of Arts degree in political science from Park College (now known as Park University) in Missouri.

Millett retired from the military in 1973 at the rank of colonel. He later stated that he retired because he felt the U.S. had "quit" in Vietnam.

Later years and family
After his military career, Millett served as a deputy sheriff in Trenton, Tennessee. He eventually moved to Idyllwild, California, where he would remain for the rest of his life. He regularly appeared at events celebrating veterans, both in the Riverside County area and elsewhere around the country. He was a member of the Congressional Medal of Honor Society and the California Commandery of the Military Order of Foreign Wars.

Millett's first marriage, to Virginia Young, ended in divorce. During the festivities surrounding his Medal of Honor award in 1951, he met Winona Williams. The two were later married and had four children: Lewis Lee Jr., Timothy, John, and Elizabeth. By the time of Winona Millett's death in 1993, the couple had been married over 40 years. Millett's son John, an Army staff sergeant, was among more than 240 U.S. military members killed in 1985 when their airplane, Arrow Air Flight 1285, crashed in Gander, Newfoundland, while carrying them home from peacekeeping duty in the Sinai Peninsula.

Millett died of congestive heart failure on November 14, 2009, one month short of his 89th birthday. He died at the Jerry L. Pettis Memorial VA Medical Center in Loma Linda, California, after being hospitalized four days earlier. He had experienced various health problems over the last few years of his life, including diabetes. His funeral was held December 5, 2009 at Riverside National Cemetery in Riverside, California and his grave can be found in section 2, grave #1910.

Awards and honors

Millett's military decorations include the Medal of Honor, the Distinguished Service Cross, the Silver Star, two Legions of Merit, three Bronze Star Medals, four Purple Hearts, and three Air Medals.

His other United States military awards include the Combat Infantryman Badge, Ranger Tab, Good Conduct Medal, American Defense Service Medal, American Campaign Medal, European-African-Middle Eastern Campaign Medal, World War II Victory Medal, Army of Occupation Medal, National Defense Service Medal, Korean Service Medal, Armed Forces Expeditionary Medal and the Vietnam Service Medal.

His international military awards include the Canadian Volunteer Service Medal with Overseas Clasp, the Canadian Victory Medal, the Vietnam Cross of Gallantry, the Croix de Guerre, the United Nations Korea Medal, and the Republic of Vietnam Campaign Medal.

Medal of Honor citation
Millett's official Medal of Honor citation reads:

Capt. Millett, Company E, distinguished himself by conspicuous gallantry and intrepidity above and beyond the call of duty in action. While personally leading his company in an attack against a strongly held position he noted that the 1st Platoon was pinned down by small-arms, automatic, and antitank fire. Capt. Millett ordered the 3d Platoon forward, placed himself at the head of the 2 platoons, and, with fixed bayonet, led the assault up the fire-swept hill. In the fierce charge Capt. Millett bayoneted 2 enemy soldiers and boldly continued on, throwing grenades, clubbing and bayoneting the enemy, while urging his men forward by shouting encouragement. Despite vicious opposing fire, the whirlwind hand-to-hand assault carried to the crest of the hill. His dauntless leadership and personal courage so inspired his men that they stormed into the hostile position and used their bayonets with such lethal effect that the enemy fled in wild disorder. During this fierce onslaught Capt. Millett was wounded by grenade fragments but refused evacuation until the objective was taken and firmly secured. The superb leadership, conspicuous courage, and consummate devotion to duty demonstrated by Capt. Millett were directly responsible for the successful accomplishment of a hazardous mission and reflect the highest credit on himself and the heroic traditions of the military service.

Other honors
At Osan Air Base in South Korea, "Millett Road" is named after Colonel Millett. It runs up Hill 180, where the Battle of Bayonet Hill / Hill 180 Memorial  is located. An annual memorial ceremony is hosted at this site under the lead of the US Army 35th Air Defense Artillery Brigade and the Colonel Lewis L. Millett Hill 180 Memorial VFW (Veterans of Foreign War) Post 8180. This hill was previously believed to be the location of where he led the legendary bayonet charge. Additional  research supports that the location of the battle was actually north of Suwon, near Anyang.

A Golden Palm Star on the Palm Springs Walk of Stars was dedicated to Millet for Veterans Day in 1999, recognizing him as one of five Medal of Honor recipients from the Southern California desert area.

In 2009, a park in San Jacinto, California, was named in honor of Millett.

At the US Army Infantry Museum at Fort Benning, Georgia, one of the life size dioramas depicting notable Infantry actions is of Millett's bayonet charge up Hill 180 during the Korean War.  Millett is clearly visible leading the charge preparing to bayonet a North Korean soldier.

See also

 List of Korean War Medal of Honor recipients
 List of Bates College people

References

External links
 
 

1920 births
2009 deaths
Korean War recipients of the Medal of Honor
United States Army Medal of Honor recipients
United States Army Air Forces soldiers
Canadian Army soldiers
United States Army officers
United States Army personnel of World War II
United States Army personnel of the Korean War
United States Army personnel of the Vietnam War
Recipients of the Distinguished Service Cross (United States)
Recipients of the Silver Star
Recipients of the Legion of Merit
Recipients of the Gallantry Cross (Vietnam)
Recipients of the Croix de Guerre (France)
Recipients of the Air Medal
United States Army personnel who were court-martialed
Bates College alumni
People from Mechanic Falls, Maine
Burials at Riverside National Cemetery
People from Dartmouth, Massachusetts
People from Trenton, Tennessee
Canadian military personnel of World War II
Military personnel from Massachusetts